Paula Maria Valdivia Monserrat (born 23 December 1995) is a Spanish handball player for BM Remudas and the Spanish national team.

She participated at the 2018 European Women's Handball Championship.

References 

Living people
1995 births
Sportspeople from Algeciras
Spanish female handball players
Spanish expatriate sportspeople in France
Competitors at the 2018 Mediterranean Games
Competitors at the 2022 Mediterranean Games
Mediterranean Games gold medalists for Spain
Mediterranean Games medalists in handball
Expatriate handball players